Leamington Spa Hospital is located on Heathcote Lane in Warwick, Warwickshire, in England. Originally an isolation hospital, it is now a hospital run by South Warwickshire NHS Foundation Trust specialising in rehabilitation.

History
The facility was established as an isolation hospital for treating contagious diseases known as Heathcote Hospital in 1887. A nurses' home was built 1937. The hospital started to focus specifically on tuberculosis cases in 1952 and was converted for use as a geriatric hospital in 1959.

In the early 21st century steps were take to convert the buildings for use as a rehabilitation centre. Feldon Ward, which was refurbished for use as a state-of-the-art stroke unit, re-opened in 2006. Campion and Chadwick Wards, which form the core of the new rehabilitation hospital, were similarly refurbished and officially opened by the Princess Royal on 29 January 2015.

See also
 List of hospitals in England

References

NHS hospitals in England
Hospitals in Warwickshire
Tuberculosis sanatoria in the United Kingdom
Buildings and structures in Leamington Spa
Hospitals established in 1887
Rehabilitation hospitals